Boy Story (stylized as BOY STORY) is a Chinese boy band launched by JYP Entertainment and Tencent Music Entertainment Group (TME). The group is composed of six members: Hanyu, Zihao, Xinlong, Zeyu, Ming Rui, and Shuyang. On September 1, 2017  Boy Story released their first single "How Old R U". On September 21, 2018, Boy Story made an official debut with their first mini album Enough.

History

Pre-debut project 

Under the JYP Entertainment vision "K-pop 3.0" or "Globalization by Localization", the label announced its plans to produce localized acts aiming at both the Chinese and Japanese markets in early 2018. Boy Story was the first group formed under this strategy, with the group's six members being selected by JYPE founder Park Jin-young as early as 2016 and have trained under the company ever since.

Since September 2017, the "Real Project" pre-debut series was launched with four singles in order to make way for the group's official debut in September 2018. The first release under their pre-debut series was "How Old R U", which was released on September 8, 2017. The second single was "Can't Stop" that was released on December 15, 2017.

In the middle of their "Real Project" pre-debut series, Boy Story made an appearance on the 2018 'Lantern Festival Joy Party (Yuan Xiao Xi Le Hui / 元宵喜乐会)', a special program of channel Hunan Satellite TV that airs annually in celebration of China's Lantern Festival. The group performed their songs "How Old R U" and "Can't Stop" at the event.

The group's third single for their pre-debut project was "Jump Up" which was released on March 30, 2018. To conclude the pre-debut project, the song "Handz Up", produced by J.Y.Park himself, was released on June 12, 2018.

2018–present: Debut and promotions in China 
Boy Story made their official debut on September 21, 2018 with their first mini album Enough that included all the pre-debut singles and the debut song "Enough". On October 21, 2018, the group released "Stay Magical" (奇妙里). The following month, Boy Story released the song "For U" on November 22, 2018.

Boy Story released "Oh My Gosh" on March 29, 2019, followed by another comeback on July 26, 2019 with "Too Busy" featuring Jackson Wang.

On September 29, 2019, Boy Story performed on the first day of KCON 2019 held at the IMPACT Arena in Bangkok, Thailand.

On January 6, 2020, Boy Story released their second extended play I=U=WE: 序 as the prologue (序) of their "I=U=WE" trilogy series. The members were involved in writing the lyrics and composing the music for the album, which thematically tells about the joys, sorrows and inner changes in growing up and announcing the group's transformation from being boys to being teenagers.

On May 6, 2020, the group held their first online concert in China titled "STAGE: On Air" in collaboration with the short-video mobile platform Tencent Weish. With the theme "The Confession of Birth", the concert recorded over 810,000 concurrent viewers. It was then announced that two more dates for "STAGE: On Air" will be held within the year. The concert was sponsored by the Korea Agro-Fisheries & Food Trade Corporation and is evaluated to have "opened a new chapter for the Korea-China exchange relationship in the untact time."

On July 4, 2020, Boy Story held the second date of their "STAGE: On Air" online concert, amassing over 3,380,000 viewers in real-time. This number is a 320% increase compared to the number of audience recorded for the group's last online concert held earlier in May of that year.

Boy Story was then invited to perform at the Bilibili World Shanghai Station, an online entertainment festival held by video-sharing website company Bilibili on August 7, 2020. The group was reported to have performed to a viewership of over 1 million people who watched the live broadcast for the event.

On September 1, 2020, Boy Story held the third and final date of their "STAGE: On Air" online concert, recording over 1.35 million concurrent viewers. The cumulative total number of viewers for all three live broadcasts held by the group reached 5 million.

In line with their second anniversary, the group held an online fan event titled "FLY 2 U" on September 20, 2020. The event garnered over 560,000 concurrent viewers, setting a record at QQ Music.

The group then released the song "WAI" on October 28, 2020 as part of the official soundtrack for the Chinese web drama Airbenders. The song then topped the Asian New Songs Chart on the day of release.

For the first part of their "I=U=WE" trilogy series, Boy Story released their third EP I=U=WE: I on November 27, 2020. The album thematically shows the various conflicts and collisions in adolescence, and tells about a person who "has his own ideas and ideas, shows publicity and personality, but is also rebellious, uneasy and confused".

Members 
 Jia Han Yu (贾涵予)
 Li Zi Hao (李梓豪) 
 He Xin Long (贺鑫隆)
 Yu Ze Yu (于泽宇)
 Gou Ming Rui (苟明睿) 
 Ren Shu Yang (任书漾)

Discography

Extended plays

Singles

Awards and nominations

Music Shows

Videography

Music Videos

References

External links 
  

JYP Entertainment artists
2018 establishments in China
Chinese boy bands
Chinese pop music groups
Chinese idols
Mandopop musical groups